Sargon the Sorcerer is the name of several fictional characters, the first incarnation of the character appearing in American comic books published by DC Comics during the Golden Age.

The original incarnation of the is John Sargent, son of archaeologist Richard Biddle Sargent who gained magical powers after reciting an incantation while possessing the artifact on hand, having been gifted to his mother and then himself. Fearing the perception he may receive from having genuine magical powers, the character opted to form a stage magician persona to disguise his genuine magic as stage magic. Over time, he became a crime-fighter and was notably a peer of other magic users such as Zatara and Baron Winters. The character is notably killed during a ritual meant to help the Swamp Thing and Deadman battle the Great Darkness.

The second Sargon, David Sarget, first appears in Helmet of Fate: Sargon #1 (April 2007) and was created by Steve Niles and Scott Hampton. David is the grandson of John Sarget whom gained a shard of the Ruby of Life after demons attempted to bargain away John's estate due to being unable to explore the mansions from protection spells to David, unaware of his grandfather's magical history. Upon being bestowed the shard to his chest, he succeeds his grandfather and establishes himself as a mystic superhero. The character's tenure is short-lived, as he is seemingly killed off while at the mercy of Lobo in hell after sacrificing his own energies to transport heroes to the world of the living.

After the New 52 reboot, the character's history changed; while John's lifetime mirrors the Golden Age storylines, the character is instead succeeded his daughter, Jaimini Sargent. Unlike prior depictions of Sargon, Jaimni is portrayed primarily as a villain. The character appears of East Indian descent and is an adversary of John Constantine, having usurped her father's name as Sargon the Sorceress and his position within the Cult of the Cold Flame.

Sargon appeared in live-action in the Arrowverse crossover Crisis on Infinite Earths, portrayed by Raúl Herrera.

Publication history 
John Sargent, the original Sargon,  first appeared in All-American Comics #26 (May 1941), and was created by John B. Wentworth and Howard Purcell. The character continued in All-American Comics until issue #50 (June 1943), and then moved to Comic Cavalcade (1943-1946) and Sensation Comics (1946-1948).

Fictional character biography

John Sargent

Sargon debuted in All-American Comics #26, with a publication date of May 1941. He was a stage magician, dressed like a swami complete with turban, to disguise the fact that he wielded true mystical powers, passing off such feats as illusions.  As a child, he came into possession of the mystic Ruby of Life which allowed him to control anything he touches (touching the ground lets him erect a wall, for instance).

Taking his professional name from the ancient king of the same name, Sargon has had a checkered career, acting mostly as a hero during the Golden Age aided first by his lady assistant Flora Styles, and later by his cartoonish fat little comic relief sidekick / manager Maximillian O'Leary as he battled crooks, spies and his azure-skinned archenemy the Blue Lama, the Queen of Black Magic.

He re-emerges in the Silver Age – as a villain, at least at first. It was later explained that his villainous activities were the result of certain side effects of possessing the Ruby of Life. He was brought back for occasional guest appearances in the Silver Age and was awarded with an honorary membership in the Justice League in Justice League of America #99 in 1972. Sargon later explained that he moved from his home of Earth-Two to take up residence on Earth-One in 1950.

Sargon maintained contacts with several other mages in the DC Universe, notably Baron Winters, Zatara (a fellow faux stage magician), and the younger mage John Constantine. Sargon answered the summons of Constantine to participate in a ritual at the mansion of Winters to help deal with the effects of the Crisis on Infinite Earths, using the Swamp Thing as their portal into the war being fought in Hell. Locking hands in a circle of power, and using the psychic powers of Constantine's drunken acquaintance Mento, the group of sorcerers (which also included Zatara's daughter Zatanna) observed the events unfolding, and attempted in turn to channel their magical powers into several other mystical characters present in Hell, including Etrigan, the original Doctor Fate, and the Spectre.

Their enemy, a primal form of evil (called the Great Evil Beast) that was surging upwards to obliterate everything in its path, sensed their interference and lashed out several times; its power raced around the circle, finding a weak link and incinerating it. The first to fall was Sargon. At first panicking and crying out for the others to help him, and almost pulling his hands away from the circle, Sargon was rebuked by Zatara to maintain his composure and die like a sorcerer. In a final act of will, Sargon apologized for his outburst, calmly sat in place and was burned alive without a whimper, never letting go of his colleagues' hands the entire time. This ritual also kills Zatara and drives Mento completely insane.

Sargon would later return in Swamp Thing, "borrowing" the body of an elderly German man named Koestler and planning to lead the souls trapped in Hell in an assault on Heaven. He sacrificed this form to save his niece, Gracie Brody.

During the Books of Magic series, the Phantom Stranger and young Timothy Hunter had a brief encounter with what was apparently Sargon's soul, who attempted to warn the boy of the dangers and costs of pursuing magical power. He then disintegrated right before their eyes, leaving behind his Ruby of Life.

Sargon appears in the Day of Judgement series as a gray soul in the realm of Purgatory. He presumably joins in the fight against the guardians of Purgatory when a team of living heroes arrives to bring back the soul of Hal Jordan.

In 2011, DC Comics rebooted the DC universe in "The New 52". Sargon appears briefly in Justice League Dark, where he is mentioned as one of the great magicians of the past age, among peers such as Zatara and Dr. Occult. In Constantine #1, Sargon is revealed to have been one of four powerful magicians who became corrupted by their power and formed the villainous cult known as the Cold Flame.

David John Sargent

The Helmet of Fate miniseries featured a Sargon the Sorcerer one-shot, starring his successor David John Sargent.

After dropping out of college, having at least seven relationships, and a brief stint as the lead singer in a band, David spent the rest of his life as a drifter on the side of the road. One day two men who claimed to represent the estate of his grandfather, the original Sargon, found David and told him that he was his heir. Actually, these men were demons trying to find Sargon's Ruby of Life, but could not do so because of the protection spells he had placed on his house.

David was tricked into signing away his grandfather's estate over to the two men, who then prepared to force him to find the Ruby when the Helmet of Fate suddenly appeared. David escaped the two and was led into his grandfather's secret attic by Sargon's ghost. Searching around, he found his grandfather's old props, his suit and turban, which contained some pieces of the Ruby. Those pieces then went into David's chest; through them Sargon was able to project himself in front of his grandson. He explained to David that he needed a successor to his name to find the remaining pieces of the Ruby, which had somehow shattered, and he was the only member of his bloodline still alive. He also explained that he pulled the Helmet off its course in order to provide a distraction long enough to grant David the Ruby's power.

David accepted the role of Sargon the Sorcerer, and armed with new mystical abilities, went to drive the two men from his home. At the time, the two used a piece of the Ruby they acquired to turn themselves into demons, and managed to weaken the Helmet. David then quickly disposed of the two, and sent the Helmet back on its course after placing a piece of himself into it.

David went on to play a part in Reign in Hell, assisting Zatanna and Blue Devil, and ultimately sacrificing himself to Lobo's mercy to allow many heroes and anti-heroes out of Hell; this event left Zatanna and Blue Devil traumatized, as they were the ones who went to Sargon for help in the first place.

Jaimini Sargent
In the Constantine: The Spark and the Flame, Jamini is revealed to have taken the powers of her father (whom has since became corrupted) and his role in the group, calling herself "Sargon the Sorceress" and sets her sights on Constantine as both sought to reconstruct a mystical item known as the "Croyden Compass", a magical artifact that can seek out magical power sources within intent on increasing her already formidable sorcery. After learning Constantine was also after the artifact and already  had gained its dial. As Constantine sought the lens, he is ensnared into a trap by Sargon, who attempts to force the location of the lens out of him, as she and Tannark were unable to find the lens within the shop of Agnus Croyden's son, Phillip. Constantine reveals that his son's eyes are the lens they sought but frees the Riddling Butcher, an enemy of Jaimini's father in the past and leaves her to fight the demon despite predicting she would emerge victorious.

In other media
Sargon the Sorcerer makes a cameo appearance in the Arrowverse crossover event Crisis on Infinite Earths, portrayed by Raúl Herrera. He attempts to rob a bank while using an illusion of a giant Beebo toy as a diversion. When Supergirl, the Flash, Sara Lance, the Atom, Heat Wave, and Batwoman fight it, they discover it is not real. Lance and Flash later track down Sargon and knock him out, causing his illusion to melt.

References

External links
 Sargon the Sorcerer at Don Markstein's Toonopedia. Archived from the original on February 15, 2017.

All-American Publications characters
Comics characters introduced in 1941
DC Comics superheroes
DC Comics supervillains
DC Comics fantasy characters
DC Comics characters who use magic
Fictional stage magicians
DC Comics undead characters
Golden Age superheroes
Mythology in DC Comics